The 1972 Swedish Pro Tennis Championships was a men's tennis tournament played on indoor carpet courts. It was the 1st edition of Swedish Pro Tennis Championships, and was part of the 1972 World Championship Tennis circuit. It took place at the Scandinavium in Gothenburg, Sweden, from 30 October until 5 November 1972.

The singles line up featured Toronto, Las Vegas, St. Louis, Fort Worth, Alamo and Vancouver WCT winner John Newcombe, US Open runner-up, Louisville and Montreal WCT champion Arthur Ashe, and Chicago WCT finalist, Boston WCT and Stockholm finalist Tom Okker. Also competing were Cleveland WCT winner Mark Cox, Richmond, Miami, Las Vegas and Alamo WCT runner-up Cliff Drysdale, Marty Riessen, Robert Lutz and Nikola Pilić.

Finals

Singles

 John Newcombe defeated  Roy Emerson, 6–0, 6–3, 6–1
 It was Newcombe's 6th title of the year, and his 18th overall. It was his 6th WCT title of the year, and his 11th overall.

Doubles

 Tom Okker /  Marty Riessen defeated  Ismail El Shafei /  Brian Fairlie, 6–2, 7–6

See also
 1972 Swedish Open
 1972 Stockholm Open

References